Harriet Bell Hayden (1816-1893) was an African-American antislavery activist in Boston, Massachusetts. She and her husband, Louis Hayden, were the primary operators of the Underground Railroad in Boston and also aided the John Brown slave revolt conspiracy.

Early life 
She was born in Kentucky in 1816.  Around 1842, Harriet Bell married Lewis Hayden after his wife and children had been sold away to another slaveholder. Harriet Bell had one son named Jo, who Lewis adopted following their marriage. On September 28, 1844, after careful planning, the Haydens escaped their Kentucky plantation and fled to Canada. Central to their escape was the assistance of Reverend Calvin Fairbank, who, following their escape to Canada was arrested and given a 15-year sentence for his aid in the Haydens escape. By 1846, the Haydens had permanently relocated to the Beacon Hill neighborhood of Boston, MA.

Underground Railroad activism 
Upon relocation to Boston, Harriet and Lewis began putting significant financial resources into helping blacks escape the South and move North. At their home, Harriet opened a boardinghouse where she housed and protected escaped African Americans. The Hayden household sheltered hundreds of blacks seeking freedom, in fact, they "harbored 75 percent of all slaves passing through Boston." Following the passage of the Fugitive Slave Act in 1850, she managed and operated Boston's main Underground Railroad operations, and was key to leading people through Boston's tunnel system. Harriet along with her husband were praised by fellow abolitionists Frederick Douglass and William Lloyd Garrison for their significant efforts in aiding escaped blacks. One of the more frequent visitors to the Hayden's household during there antebellum activist years was John Brown. Between 1857 and 1859 Brown visited and stayed with the Haydens and disclosed his plans to raid Harper's Ferry, Virginia. Harriet and her husband helped to raise money in support of Brown's raid. It was also rumored that the Haydens kept barrels of gunpowder in their home and threatened to light it if anyone attempted to take an escaped slave from their house.

Legacy 
Harriet Hayden died of pneumonia in her home at the age of 74 in 1893. Following her death, Harriet Hayden donated the entirety of their estate, which amounted to around $5,000, to endow a scholarship at Harvard University. The scholarship was to be used to financially assist black medical students at the Harvard University Medical School. The scholarship is still honored today and black students are still benefiting from the generosity and legacy of the Haydens.  Her home at 66 Philips Street is a national historic site and a stop along the Black Heritage Trail, a trail that goes through the Beacon Hill neighborhood and has many stops at notable African American Heritage sites. Her home, however, is still occupied by a private residence and is not open to the public.

See also 
Lewis and Harriet Hayden House

References

External links
Lewis and Harriet Hayden House, the National Park Service
Hayden Scholarship at Harvard University

1816 births
1893 deaths
African-American activists
African-American abolitionists
Fugitive American slaves
Underground Railroad people
African-American history in Boston
Activists from Kentucky
People from Kentucky